Lataisha Jackson (born August 4, 1983) is a Democratic member of the Mississippi House of Representatives, representing the 11th district. Jackson took office after winning a 2013 special election.

In 2022, Jackson made her first visit to Africa, visiting Nigeria for a series of engagements.

References

External links
 Lataisha Jackson at Vote Smart
 Lataisha Jackson at Ballotpedia
 Lataisha Jackson at Mississippi House of Representatives

1983 births
Living people
Democratic Party members of the Mississippi House of Representatives
Alabama State University alumni
Women state legislators in Mississippi
African-American state legislators in Mississippi
21st-century American politicians
21st-century American women politicians
21st-century African-American women
21st-century African-American politicians
20th-century African-American people
20th-century African-American women